The 1958 Buenos Aires Grand Prix was a Formula Libre race held at Buenos Aires on 2 February 1958, at the Autódromo Oscar Alfredo Gálvez.

Classification

References

Buenos Aires Grand Prix
Buenos Aires Grand Prix
1958 in motorsport